"In the Rain" is a 1972 soul single by American vocal group The Dramatics, from their first album, Whatcha See Is Whatcha Get. It was written by Tony Hester. It was released in February 1972. The track is notable for its use of sounds of rain and thunder, first heard before the song's introduction, then throughout the instrumental and chorus sections.

Chart performance
"In the Rain" reached No. 5 on the Billboard Hot 100 singles chart and spent four weeks at No. 1  on the Best Selling Soul Singles chart. It sold over one million copies and is the group's biggest hit.  Billboard ranked it as the No. 53 song for 1972.

Song background
The song's lyrics state that, because of a broken love relationship, the singer wants to go out and stand in the rain so that no one can see him cry.
"Once the rain starts falling on my face,
You won't see a single trace,
Of the tears I'm  crying,
Because of you I'm crying. 
Don't want you to see me cry.
Let me go, Let me go
Let me go!"

Chart positions

Cover versions
Keith Sweat, on his 1987 album Make It Last Forever
The R&B group Xscape, in 1997, from the soundtrack of Love Jones
The smooth jazz artist Boney James, featuring Dwele, for his 2006 album Shine

Sampling
The song has been sampled by many hip hop artists such as Wu-Tang Clan, Jadakiss, Big L, and Lil Wayne. As of 2022, music data website WhoSampled lists that it has used in sampling over 90 times.

See also
List of number-one R&B singles of 1972 (U.S.)

References

External links
 
 

1971 songs
1972 singles
The Dramatics songs
Stax Records singles